USS Edith M. III (SP-196) was a United States Navy patrol vessel in commission from 1917 to 1919.

Edith M. III was built by V. J. Osborn at Croton-on-Hudson, New York, as a civilian motorboat of the same name in 1909. The United States Navy purchased her for World War I service in June 1917 and commissioned her on 5 November 1917 as USS Edith M. III''' (SP-196).Edith M. III was assigned to the 3rd Naval District, where she spent the remainder of World War I carrying men and provisions around New York Harbor.

Decommissioned on 8 May 1919, Edith M. III'' was sold on 2 July 1919 and entered passenger service in New York Harbor captained by Louis H. Hazzard.

References 

 Navy History and Heritage Command Online Library of Selected Images: U.S. Navy Ships: USS Edith M. III (SP-196), 1917-1919. Previously the civilian motor boat Edith M. III.
 NavSource Online: Section Patrol Craft Photo Archive Edith M. III (SP 196)

Patrol vessels of the United States Navy
Ships built in New York (state)
World War I patrol vessels of the United States
1909 ships